"Mela Loot Liya" is the unofficial anthem of 2020 Pakistan Super League by Ali Zafar released on the strong insistence of fans amidst the criticism received by Tayyar Hain, the official anthem of fifth season of the Pakistan Super League. It has been written, composed, arranged, produced by Ali Zafar himself. It was released on 1 March by Lightingagle Records and crossed over 3 Million hits on YouTube in 24 hours.

Background 
The official anthem of PSL V soon after its release received strong criticism from fans and Ali Zafar trended top on Twitter in Pakistan as fans remembered him for his anthems in first three editions which were liked by fans especially Ab Khel Jamay Ga from second edition. Responding to fans Ali Zafar wrote on Twitter that Pakistan Super League is our country's brand and urged fans to support it.

After PSL opening ceremony Ali Azmat said in an interview with Waseem Badaami on ARY News that bloggers were hired for campaign against their anthem by rival singer pointing towards Ali Zafar which he denied. After much insistence from fans to make another anthem, Ali Zafar on 23 February announced that he is making a new anthem.

Release 
The anthem was released on 1 March on YouTube by Lightingale Records. The anthem video was conceived, directed and choreographed by Ali Zafar and he credited the anthem to fans. In an interview to Waseem Badami on ARY News after release he said it is not competition with anyone but just for our fans and country and to support our league and denied perception that it was pre-planned.

Reception 
The anthem became an overnight hit and became fastest to get 1 million hits on YouTube and crossed over 3 million within 24 hours. As of 24 March 2020, the song has 8.9 Million Views on YouTube

See also 
 Tayyar Hain
 List of Pakistan Super League anthems
 2020 Pakistan Super League

References 

2020 songs
2020 Pakistan Super League
Pakistan Super League anthems
Ali Zafar songs